Helcogramma capidata, known commonly as the hooded triplefin, is a species of triplefin blenny in the genus Helcogramma. It was described by Richard Rosenblatt in 1960. This species is widespread in the western Pacific Ocean from the Mariana Islands east to Samoa, Fiji and Tonga; it has been recorded from Sabah too.

References

Hooded triplefin
Fish described in 1960